The knockout stage of the 2014 FIFA World Cup was the second and final stage of the competition, following the group stage. It began on 28 June with the round of 16 and ended on 13 July with the final match of the tournament, held at Estádio do Maracanã, Rio de Janeiro. The top two teams from each group (16 in total) advanced to the knockout stage to compete in a single-elimination tournament. A third-place match was played between the two losing teams of the semi-finals.

In all matches in the knockout stage, if the score was level at the end of 90 minutes, two 15-minute periods of extra time were played. If the score was still level after extra time, the match was decided by a penalty shoot-out.

All times listed below are in Brasília official time (UTC−3).

Qualified teams
The top two placed teams from each of the eight groups qualified for the knockout stage.

Bracket

Round of 16

Brazil vs Chile

The two teams had met in 68 previous matches, including three times in the FIFA World Cup knockout stage, all won by Brazil (1962, semi-finals: 4–2; 1998, round of 16: 4–1; 2010, round of 16: 3–0).

Brazil opened the scoring when Thiago Silva flicked on a corner kick before David Luiz turned the ball into the net with his thigh. While replays suggested that Chilean defender Gonzalo Jara may have had the last touch, FIFA later confirmed that the goal was scored by Luiz, not Jara. Chile equalised when Hulk lost possession after a throw-in in his own half; Eduardo Vargas stole the ball and passed to Alexis Sánchez to score.

In the second half, Hulk's goal was disallowed as Howard Webb adjudged that the player used his arm in bringing down the ball and gave him a yellow card instead. Chances were few after that with Brazil dominating possession with Hulk forcing Claudio Bravo into a decent save, and the match went to extra time. The best chance of extra time came in the last seconds as Mauricio Pinilla's shot hit the crossbar. In the resulting penalty shootout, the score was tied 2–2 after four rounds, with Brazil goalkeeper Júlio César saving from Pinilla and Sánchez, while Willian missed and Hulk's shot was saved by Bravo. In the fifth round, Neymar scored his penalty, meaning Chile had to score, but Jara's shot hit the inside of the post. Brazil advanced to the quarter-finals to face Colombia.

The result meant that in all four World Cups where Chile qualified for the knockout stage, they were eliminated by Brazil.

Colombia vs Uruguay
The two teams had met in 38 previous matches, including in the 1962 FIFA World Cup group stage, won 2–1 by Uruguay. Their most recent meetings were in the 2014 FIFA World Cup qualifiers, with both teams winning at home, Colombia winning 4–0 and Uruguay winning 2–0. Uruguayan striker Luis Suárez was not in the line-up because of a nine-game ban imposed by FIFA due to a biting incident involving Italian defender Giorgio Chiellini during their final group stage match. This was the first (and only) match of Uruguay in Maracanã Stadium in a World Cup since the historical Maracanazo.

Colombia won 2–0 with both goals from James Rodríguez, the first in the 28th minute, where he controlled Abel Aguilar's headed ball on his chest before volleying left-footed from 25 yards out with the ball going in off the underside of the crossbar, which won the 2014 FIFA Puskás Award later in the year.
The second goal, in the 50th minute, was a close-range shot from six yards out after receiving the ball from a header by Juan Cuadrado on the right.

Colombia progressed through to the quarter-finals for the first time in their history, where they would face Brazil.

Netherlands vs Mexico

The two teams had met in six previous matches, including in the 1998 FIFA World Cup group stage, a 2–2 draw. Mexico midfielder José Juan Vázquez was suspended for the match due to accumulation of yellow cards.

Giovani dos Santos opened the scoring for Mexico early in the second half with a left-footed volley from outside the box after gathering a Dutch clearance.	
Mexico led until the 88th minute, when a Dutch corner was headed back by substitute Klaas-Jan Huntelaar for Wesley Sneijder to equalise with a hard shot from 16 yards. Only a few minutes later, with stoppage time coming to a close, Arjen Robben drew a penalty for the Netherlands after being fouled by Rafael Márquez on the right of the penalty area, which Huntelaar converted to win the match for the Netherlands. Netherlands advanced to the quarter-finals to face Costa Rica, while Mexico were eliminated in the round of 16 for the sixth tournament in a row.

Costa Rica vs Greece
The two teams had never met before. This match was Greece's first ever in the FIFA World Cup knockout stage.

Bryan Ruiz opened the scoring in the 52nd minute when Christian Bolaños passed to him and he shot low left-footed from outside the penalty area to the right corner of the net with Greek goalkeeper Orestis Karnezis not moving on his line. Costa Rica were then reduced to 10 men with Óscar Duarte being sent off after picking up a second yellow card. Sokratis Papastathopoulos equalised in injury time shooting into the net from seven yards out after Costa Rica goalkeeper Keylor Navas had saved an initial shot from Theofanis Gekas. No goals were scored in extra time, and the match went to a penalty shoot-out. During the intermission before the penalty shoot-out, the Greek coach Fernando Santos was sent off following a dispute with the referee. In the penalty shoot-out, Navas saved Gekas' shot before Michael Umaña scored the winning penalty for Costa Rica hitting it high to the goalkeeper's right.

This marked the first time that Costa Rica progressed to the quarter-finals in a FIFA World Cup, where they faced the Netherlands.

France vs Nigeria

The two teams had met in one previous match, in a friendly in 2009, won by Nigeria 1–0.

Paul Pogba had the best chance in the first half but his right foot volley after a cross from the right was saved by Vincent Enyeama. In the second half Yohan Cabaye saw a shot come back off the bar.	The opening goal came with 11 minutes to play when Pogba headed into the net after a mistake by Enyeama where he failed to hold onto a corner kick from the left by Mathieu Valbuena. In injury time, France got a second when Joseph Yobo put into his own net under pressure from Antoine Griezmann after a cross from the right by Valbuena.

France advanced to the quarter-finals to face Germany, while Nigeria were eliminated at the round of 16 in all three World Cups where they reached the knockout stage.

Germany vs Algeria
The two teams had met in two previous matches, including in the 1982 FIFA World Cup group stage, where Algeria defeated West Germany 2–1. This match was Algeria's first ever in the FIFA World Cup knockout stage.

After a goalless 90 minutes, Germany opened the scoring two minutes into extra time, when half-time substitute André Schürrle scored with a left foot back-heel from Thomas Müller's cross from the left.	
Germany extended the lead in the 120th minute when Mesut Özil converted with his left foot high into the net after Schürrle's shot was blocked on the line, but Algeria pulled one back in injury time when substitute Abdelmoumene Djabou scored with his left foot from six yards after a cross from the right by Sofiane Feghouli.

Germany advanced to the quarter-finals to face France, continuing their streak of reaching the last eight in every World Cup since 1954. Djabou's goal, timed at 120 minutes and 51 seconds, was the latest goal in World Cup history, surpassing Alessandro Del Piero's goal against Germany in 2006, timed at 120 minutes and 32 seconds.

Argentina vs Switzerland
The two teams had met in six previous matches, including in the 1966 FIFA World Cup group stage, won by Argentina 2–0.

The match went to extra time with Ángel Di María scoring the only goal with two minutes remaining with a side-foot finish from the right of the penalty area after a run and pass from Lionel Messi.	
Switzerland had a chance to equalise in injury time but Blerim Džemaili headed against the post then prodded the rebound wide. Argentina advanced to the quarter-finals to face Belgium.

Belgium vs United States
The two teams had met in five previous matches, including one in the 1930 FIFA World Cup group stage won by United States 3–0 and which was one of the two first FIFA World Cup matches to be played. An unofficial friendly between the two teams was scheduled on 12 June 2014 in São Paulo, but was cancelled because of traffic due to the opening ceremony and match. Belgium midfielder Steven Defour was suspended for the match, after being sent off in the last group stage match against South Korea.

In a game dominated by the Belgians, but still goalless through the first 90 minutes thanks to U.S. goalkeeper Tim Howard, U.S. striker Chris Wondolowski missed a great chance in stoppage time from less than five yards out. Thus, the game went to extra time and Belgium took the lead within two minutes. Romelu Lukaku, who came off the bench at the start of extra time, crossed from the right into the penalty area, Matt Besler failed to clear the ball, and Kevin De Bruyne shot low into the far corner from the right of the penalty area. Near the end of extra time first half, De Bruyne's through ball from the right set up Lukaku to extend the lead with a left footed shot to the net.	
The United States pulled one back early in extra time second half, when substitute Julian Green volleyed in Michael Bradley's lobbed pass with his right foot from near the penalty spot. Minutes later, the U.S. nearly equalised on a set piece routine that saw Clint Dempsey through on goal, but his first touch was too hard and the ball was corralled by Belgian goalkeeper Thibaut Courtois. Belgium held on for the win, and advanced to the quarter-finals to face Argentina.

With Belgium's victory, the 2014 World Cup became the first tournament where all the top teams of the group stage advanced to the quarter-finals. U.S. goalkeeper Tim Howard recorded 15 saves in the match, which was the most saves recorded in a match since FIFA started to keep track of the number of saves in 1966. Julian Green also became the youngest player to score a goal in the 2014 FIFA World Cup.

Quarter-finals

France vs Germany
The two teams had met in 25 previous matches, including three times in the FIFA World Cup (1958, third place match: France 6–3 West Germany; 1982 semi-finals: France 3–3 (aet) West Germany, West Germany won 5–4 on penalties; 1986, semi-finals: France 0–2 West Germany).

The only goal came in the 13th minute when Mats Hummels got ahead of his marker Raphaël Varane to head Germany into the lead from ten yards out after a free-kick from Toni Kroos on the left. Karim Benzema had a shot in second half injury time from the left which he hit straight at Manuel Neuer.

Germany advanced to the semi-finals where they would face Brazil. They became the first team to reach four straight World Cup semi-finals, breaking the record of three shared by their predecessor West Germany (1966–1974 and 1982–1990) and Brazil (1970–1978 and 1994–2002). Germany was also guaranteed their 13th top four finish, the most by any nation.

Brazil vs Colombia

The two teams had met in 25 previous matches, but never in the FIFA World Cup. This was the first time Colombia had reached the quarter-finals of the World Cup. Brazil midfielder Luiz Gustavo was suspended for the match due to accumulation of yellow cards.

Brazil took the lead in the 7th minute, when Neymar's corner from the left was turned in from close range by Thiago Silva.	
They doubled the lead in the 69th minute when David Luiz scored directly from a long-range free kick, side-footing the ball over the wall and into the top-right corner. Colombia reduced the deficit with 10 minutes to go, when James Rodríguez converted a penalty kick low into the left corner and sent the goalkeeper the wrong way. The penalty was awarded after substitute Carlos Bacca was fouled by Brazil goalkeeper Júlio César. Neymar was kneed in the back by Colombia defender Juan Camilo Zúñiga in the 88th minute, which resulted in the striker's withdrawal from the match. Subsequent medical evaluation discovered a fractured vertebra, forcing the Brazilian to miss the remainder of the tournament. Brazil advanced to the semi-final, where they faced Germany.

James's sixth goal of the tournament was enough for him to win the Golden Boot award. He also became the first player to score in his first five career World Cup matches since Peru's Teófilo Cubillas (across the 1970 and 1978 tournaments).

Argentina vs Belgium
The two teams had met in three previous matches, including twice in the FIFA World Cup (1982, group stage: Argentina 0–1 Belgium; 1986, semi-finals: Argentina 2–0 Belgium). Argentina defender Marcos Rojo was suspended for the match due to accumulation of yellow cards.

The only goal of the match was scored by Argentina forward Gonzalo Higuaín in the eighth minute, a powerful shot with his right foot from just inside the penalty area after a pass from Di María was deflected to him by Belgium defender Jan Vertonghen.	
Higuaín had a chance to extend the lead in the second half, but his shot hit the crossbar. Argentina won 1–0 to advance to the semi-finals, where they would face the Netherlands.

Netherlands vs Costa Rica
The two teams had never met before. This was the first time Costa Rica had reached the quarter-finals of the World Cup. Costa Rica defender Óscar Duarte was suspended for the match, after being sent off in the round of 16 match against Greece.

After a goalless 90 minutes, which saw Wesley Sneijder's free kick hit the post and Robin van Persie's shot deflected onto the crossbar by Costa Rica defender Yeltsin Tejeda, the match headed to extra time. In the second period, substitute Marco Ureña had a shot saved by Netherlands goalkeeper Jasper Cillessen, while Sneijder had another shot hit the crossbar. In added time at the end of 120 minutes, Dutch manager Louis van Gaal brought on Tim Krul to replace Cillessen.	
In the subsequent penalty shoot-out, Krul saved from Bryan Ruiz and Michael Umaña, while the Netherlands scored all four of their kicks to advance to the semi-finals, where they would face Argentina.

Uzbek referee Ravshan Irmatov took charge of his ninth World Cup match, breaking the record of most World Cup games officiated, which he previously held jointly with Joël Quiniou of France, Benito Archundia of Mexico, and Jorge Larrionda of Uruguay.

Semi-finals

Brazil vs Germany

The two teams had met in 21 previous matches, including in the final of the 2002 FIFA World Cup (their only previous encounter in the tournament's history), won by Brazil 2–0.

While Germany kept the same starting line-up as their quarter-final against France, Brazil made two changes: defender and captain Thiago Silva was suspended for the match due to accumulation of yellow cards, and was replaced by Dante, while forward Neymar was sidelined after suffering a fractured vertebra in the quarter-final against Colombia, and was replaced by Bernard. Germany took the lead in the 11th minute, Thomas Müller volleying in Toni Kroos's corner. Miroslav Klose scored Germany's second goal, after a passing move saw him set up by Kroos, his first shot was saved by Brazil goalkeeper Júlio César, but he slotted in the rebound. Kroos then scored two quick goals in succession, the first one after Philipp Lahm's cross was missed by Müller, the second one after stealing the ball from Fernandinho and playing a quick one-two with Sami Khedira. Khedira then scored Germany's fourth goal in six minutes, after exchanging passes with Mesut Özil, to give Germany the 5–0 half-time lead. Substitute André Schürrle added two more goals in the second half, first slotting in from Lahm's cross, then scoring via the crossbar after a cut-back from Müller. Brazil scored a consolation goal in the 90th minute, as Oscar received a pass from Marcelo, dribbled inside and scored. Germany reached their eighth World Cup final, a record by any nation, where they would face Argentina, while Brazil had to settle for the third-place play-off against the Netherlands.

The game equalled Brazil's biggest margin of defeat, a 6–0 loss to Uruguay in 1920, and it broke a 62-match home unbeaten streak in competitive matches going back to the 1975 Copa América, where they lost 3–1 to Peru in the same exact stadium of this match. The match also broke many World Cup records: It was Brazil's biggest World Cup defeat (eclipsing their 1998 final loss to France), the biggest defeat by a World Cup host nation (previous record was by three goals), and the biggest margin of victory in a World Cup semi-final (three previous semi-finals ended in 6–1 scorelines).

Klose's goal was his 16th at World Cup finals tournaments, allowing him to overtake Brazil's Ronaldo as the tournament's all-time top scorer. Germany's seven goals took their total tally in World Cup history to 223, surpassing Brazil's 221 goals to first place overall.

Netherlands vs Argentina

The two teams had met in eight previous matches, including four times in the FIFA World Cup: Netherlands won 4–0 in the second group stage of the 1974 FIFA World Cup and 2–1 in the quarter-finals of the 1998 FIFA World Cup, Argentina won 3–1 (after extra time) in the final of the 1978 FIFA World Cup, whereas a group stage encounter of the 2006 FIFA World Cup ended in a 0–0 draw.

The Netherlands made one change to their starting line-up from their quarter-final, with Nigel de Jong returning from injury to replace Memphis Depay, while Argentina made two changes, with Marcos Rojo returning from suspension to replace José María Basanta and Enzo Pérez replacing the injured Di María. The match finished 0–0 after extra-time with very little chances as both sides cancelled each other out. In the penalty shoot-out, Sergio Romero saved the first penalty from Ron Vlaar diving to his left and the fifth penalty of the shoot-out from Wesley Sneijder when he dived high to his right. Argentina scored all of their four penalties to win 4–2. Maxi Rodríguez scored the decisive fourth penalty, shooting to Dutch goalkeeper Jasper Cillessen's right to send Argentina into the final, where they would face Germany, while the Netherlands had to settle for the third-place play-off against Brazil.

This was the first World Cup semi-final to end in a goalless draw. Argentina won their fourth World Cup penalty shoot-out, tied with Germany for most wins, and were involved in their fifth World Cup shoot-out, a record for any nation.

Third place play-off
The two teams had met in 11 previous meetings, including four times in the FIFA World Cup: Netherlands won 2–0 in the second group stage of the 1974 FIFA World Cup and 2–1 in the quarter-finals of the 2010 FIFA World Cup, and Brazil won 3–2 in the quarter-finals of the 1994 FIFA World Cup and 4–2 on penalties after a 1–1 draw (after extra time) in the semi-finals of the 1998 FIFA World Cup.

Brazil made six changes in their starting line-up from their semi-final, while the Netherlands made only two, with Wesley Sneijder, who was originally part of the Dutch starting line-up, replaced by Jonathan de Guzmán after an injury during the pre-match warm-up prevented him from playing. The Netherlands opened the scoring within three minutes, after Van Persie converted a penalty kick awarded for a foul on Arjen Robben by Thiago Silva. Daley Blind extended the lead in the 17th minute, scoring after a David Luiz headed clearance fell to him inside the penalty area. Georginio Wijnaldum completed the scoring in second half injury time as he shot home from substitute Daryl Janmaat's cross from the right.	

The Netherlands finished third for the first time in their World Cup history. With Michel Vorm's participation (who was substituted into the match in second half injury time), the Netherlands became the first team to use all of their 23 players in a World Cup since the finals squads were expanded from 22 to 23 players in 2002. Brazil, who finished fourth for the second time in World Cup history, conceded a total of 14 goals in the tournament, the most they had ever allowed in a World Cup and also the most conceded by any World Cup hosts. Brazil also became the second team to concede 100 World Cup goals, after Germany. Van Persie's goal was the 100th goal that Brazil had conceded in the FIFA World Cup and made him the second highest Dutch goalscorer with six World Cup goals along with Wesley Sneijder, Arjen Robben, Dennis Bergkamp, and Rob Rensenbrink, all before Johnny Rep with seven World Cup goals. Lastly, since the beginning of the 21st century, all four World Cups in 2002, 2006, 2010, and 2014 involved the third-place victors all scoring three goals. This trend would stop in 2018, when Belgium scored two against England, followed by Croatia against Morocco four years later.

Final

The two teams had met in 20 previous matches, including six times in the FIFA World Cup: 1958, group stage: West Germany 3–1 Argentina; 1966, group stage: West Germany 0–0 Argentina; 1986, final: West Germany 2–3 Argentina; 1990, final: West Germany 1–0 Argentina; 2006, quarter-finals: Germany 1–1 Argentina (after extra time, Germany won 4–2 on penalties); 2010 FIFA World Cup, quarter-finals: Germany 4–0 Argentina. Their third final meeting is the most ever in World Cup history, and also tied the record for the most frequent fixture in tournament history, as Brazil vs Sweden and Germany vs Serbia (including Yugoslavia) had also been played seven times in the World Cup.

Both teams initially named unchanged starting line-ups from their semi-finals, but Germany had to make a late change as Sami Khedira injured his calf and was replaced by Christoph Kramer, who was himself substituted in the first half by André Schürrle after a blow to his head. In the first half, Gonzalo Higuaín shot wide after a Toni Kroos's misplaced header fell to him, and also had a goal disallowed for offside. Later, Jérôme Boateng cleared off the line after a Lionel Messi run, and Benedikt Höwedes's header hit the post. In the second half, Argentina's best chance fell to Messi, whose shot went just wide, while Toni Kroos also had a chance for Germany but could not convert. For the third World Cup final in a row, the match went to extra time. In the first half, Schürrle had a shot saved by Sergio Romero, while Rodrigo Palacio's lobbed shot was also unsuccessful. Germany scored the only goal in the second half, as Schürrle ran down the left wing and crossed for substitute Mario Götze, who controlled the ball on his chest and volleyed past Romero.

Germany won their fourth World Cup title, and their first title since German reunification (they won as West Germany in 1954, 1974, and 1990). It was the first time a European team won the tournament in the Americas. For the third tournament in a row, the World Cup was won by a European team, first time for any confederation. Argentina finished as the runners-up for the third time in their history.

A total of 171 goals were scored in the tournament, a joint record along with the 1998 FIFA World Cup. Götze's goal was the 32nd by a substitute, a World Cup record. Including the final, a total of eight matches went to extra time, a joint record along with the 1990 FIFA World Cup.

Notes

References

External links

 

2014 FIFA World Cup
2014
Germany at the 2014 FIFA World Cup
Argentina at the 2014 FIFA World Cup
Netherlands at the 2014 FIFA World Cup
France at the 2014 FIFA World Cup
Brazil at the 2014 FIFA World Cup
Mexico at the 2014 FIFA World Cup
Costa Rica at the 2014 FIFA World Cup
Uruguay at the 2014 FIFA World Cup
Nigeria at the 2014 FIFA World Cup
United States at the 2014 FIFA World Cup
Colombia at the 2014 FIFA World Cup
Algeria at the 2014 FIFA World Cup
Greece at the 2014 FIFA World Cup
Belgium at the 2014 FIFA World Cup
Switzerland at the 2014 FIFA World Cup
Chile at the 2014 FIFA World Cup